The Donetsk Metro (translit.: Donets'ke metro) is a rapid transit system construction project in Donetsk.  Construction began in 1993 and was suspended in 2011.  If finished, it could become the fifth metro in Ukraine (after the Kyiv, Kharkiv, Dnipro, and Kryvyi Rih metros). Unspecified plans for building instead an all-new light rail surface transit system are announced.

History

When the city of Donetsk reached the million inhabitants mark in the 1980s, it was entitled to build its own metro system, which was designed to follow the usual layout in the Soviet Union. In 1984, the first plans for a metro system in Donetsk were shown to the public, but construction did not immediately begin. Only after Ukraine gained independence, the Cabinet of Ministers issued a decree on 30 December 1991 to build the new underground metro system in Donetsk. The first investigation work began in 1993, and construction commenced the same year, with completion scheduled for 2002.

In 1995, due to the poor financial situation of the Donetsk municipality, the completion date was postponed to 2005. On 5 September 1997, the Prime Minister of Ukraine, Valeriy Pustovoitenko, ordered that the first line of the system should be open to the public in 8 years (2005). In 2000, the first work on four of the six underground stations began. However, the financial situation of Donetsk did not improve. In June 2003, the financial problems affected the metro workers - after seven months of work, no more wages could be paid. By then nearly 300 million Hryven (about 48 million euros) had been spent on the project. 

In 2004 the Ukrainian government assured further means for the completion of the metro by 2010. By 2007, this seemed over-optimistic due to the slow pace of construction work. However, it later emerged that Donetsk would be one of the host cities for the Euro 2012 football championships, raising hopes for the Metro to be opened by then, although the budget that had been allocated was clearly insufficient at the time.

In 2009, funding of the project was disrupted so severely that construction workers staged several strikes to demand payment of their salaries. The city mayor Oleksandr Lukianchenko informed on 22 May that the planned 500 million hryvnia (~$65 mln) for the metro the city of Donetsk has never received.

In 2011, the city mayor announced that construction was to be suspended indefinitely due to continuing underfunding and inability to finish a first line in time for Euro 2012.

In 2012 the Vice-Prime-Minister Borys Kolesnikov stated that Ukrzaliznytsia was to start to work on the project of ground-level metro in Donetsk. The goal was to open the first line of metro no later than December 2014.

The work on the metro line has completely stopped in 2014 due to War in Donbass. In December 2014, the Donetsk People's Republic set up a commission to discuss the future of the Donetsk metro. The war has greatly compromised most of economic projects that were planned in the Donetsk area due to the chronic socio-economical instability it triggered. 

It was reported in 2022 that the incompleted metro communications were at risk of flooding from the sealed coal mines. Hence, their construction was suspended for an indefinite time

The original project

The system's red line, Proletarsko-Kyivska, is planned to extend  with 15 stations. Additionally, the blue line, Shakhtarsko-Makiyivs'ka Line, is planned to extend . Finally, the green line, Petrovs'ko-Chervonohvardiyska Line, is to have 14 stations.

References

External links

  metro.donetsk.ua - Unofficial Donetsk metro website

Metro
Underground rapid transit in Ukraine
Proposed public transport in Ukraine
Cancelled rapid transit lines and systems